"World Turning" is a song written by Christine McVie and Lindsey Buckingham for the British/American rock band Fleetwood Mac's tenth album, Fleetwood Mac.

Background
While the song was written in 1975, its roots date back to 1968. Fleetwood Mac's first album, which was also titled Fleetwood Mac, contained a track titled "The World Keeps on Turning", written by founding member Peter Green. The band reworked the song, and the title was later truncated to "World Turning".

Unlike other songs on the album, "World Turning" was a collaboration with two Fleetwood Mac members: keyboardist Christine McVie, and guitarist Lindsey Buckingham. Producer Keith Olsen claimed that Stevie Nicks was initially jealous over her lack of involvement in the writing process, but eventually "got over it". Since its first appearance on Fleetwood Mac, "World Turning" has appeared on every concert tour.

Buckingham used two guitars on the track: a Fender Telecaster electric guitar and a Dobro, a resonator guitar that produces sound through one or more metal cones. He also had his low E string tuned down to a D.

Both the studio and live recordings make use of a talking drum. A Nigerian musician gave Mick Fleetwood a custom talking drum that would appear onstage for every Fleetwood Mac tour since 1969.

Starting in 1987, on the band's Tango in the Night Tour, the band would perform an epic 10-minute live version of the song that would include a percussion section in the middle largely performed by Mick Fleetwood. Accompanied by the African percussionist Isaac Asanté, Fleetwood started off the section with his drum kit before then moving to the front of the stage with a conga drum, and then started using a "drum vest" utilising MIDI. The vest, which was connected to an amplifier, had five touch-activated pads that produced various sampled noises such as bells, screams, horns, and shattering glass.

Personnel
Mick Fleetwood – drums, talking drum, tambourine
John McVie – bass guitar
Christine McVie – keyboards, lead and backing vocals, maracas
Lindsey Buckingham – Telecaster, Dobro, lead and backing vocals
Stevie Nicks - backing vocals

Covers
The song was covered by former Fleetwood Mac member  Bob Welch on his 2006 album His Fleetwood Mac Years and Beyond, Vol. 2.
Leo Kottke covered this song on his 1997 album Standing in My Shoes.

References

Fleetwood Mac songs
1975 songs
Songs written by Lindsey Buckingham
Songs written by Christine McVie